Robert de Todeni was a Norman nobleman who held lands in England after the Norman Conquest.

Background
Robert held lands in Guerny and Vesly in Normandy. The family was probably a branch of the Tosny family that originated near Eure in Normandy.

Life
In the Domesday Book of 1086, Robert is listed as the lord of Belvoir, Lincolnshire. This lordship is considered a feudal barony, making Robert the first baron of Belvoir. Besides the lands around Belvoir, Robert also received lands in Yorkshire and Leicestershire. These lands had been held prior to the Conquest by Thorgautr Lagr and others. Robert's son Berengar was given Thorgautr's lands in Oxfordshire and Nottinghamshire, which he may have held from his father. Robert also had lands in Northamptonshire, located south of Rockingham. Three of these manors were previously owned by Oswulf, probably Oswulf son of Fran.

Robert may have been the first castellan of Rockingham Castle.

Robert and his wife founded Belvoir Priory, sometime between 1076 and 1088 as a priory of St Albans Abbey. The choice to make Belvoir a dependent priory of St Albans may have been because Oswulf, previous owner of some of his lands, had also given lands to St Albans.

Death and legacy
Robert married Adelais. They had three sons – Berengar, William, and Geoffrey – as well as Albreda, Adelisa, and Agnes. Berengar inherited the Norman lands and William inherited the English lands. All three sons died without offspring, leaving their sisters as the eventual heiresses. Albreda was the eldest daughter and married Robert de Insula and died before 1129 without issue. Adelisa married Roger Bigod, and died after August 1127. Agnes, the youngest daughter, married first Ralph de Beaufour and second Hubert de Ryes. Belvoir eventually went to Cecilia Bigod, the youngest daughter of Adelisa and Roger and the Norman lands going to Hugh Bigod, son of Adelisa and Roger. Agnes is not recorded as having inherited any of lands connected with the barony of Belvoir. The historian Judith Green speculates that because Berengar did not inherit any of the English lands, he may have been the son of an earlier marriage of Robert's.

Robert died around 1093, although some older sources give a date of 1088. He was buried at Belvoir Priory, according to the priory's own history.

Citations

References

External links

 Robert of Tosny's holdings in Open Domesday Project

1090s deaths
Normans in England
English feudal barons